Khujeh Yapaqi (also Romanized as Khūjeh Yāpāqī) is a village in Zavkuh Rural District, Pishkamar District, Kalaleh County, Golestan Province, Iran. At the 2006 census, its population was 564, in 134 families.

References 

Populated places in Kalaleh County